Humberto Medina may refer to:

 Humberto Medina (dancer), Cuban dancer
 Humberto Medina (footballer) (1942–2011), Mexican footballer